Pikovnik is a small remote settlement in the hills north of Begunje in the Municipality of Cerknica in the Inner Carniola region of Slovenia.

References

External links

Pikovnik on Geopedia

Populated places in the Municipality of Cerknica